Fusion LA is a venture capital firm and an accelerator for Israeli startups in the United States. It was founded in 2017 and is headquartered in Santa Monica, California, United States.

History 
Guy Katsovich and Yair Vardi co-founded Fusion LA in 2017 as an accelerator program that works with Israeli startups attempting to find a foothold in the United States. The founders connected during their military service as officers in Unit 8200, Israel’s equivalent of the American National Security Agency (NSA). Initially, the accelerator invested 20,000 USD in over 30 early-stage startups that participated in the program between 2017-2019.  In early 2020, they partnered with GoAhead Ventures, a venture capital firm from California, and increased their investment fund to 110,000 USD per early-stage startup. Presently, it is associated with more than 50 early-stage startups across various industrial domains. In December 2020, Fusion LA launched the UAE-IL Tech Zone, a community initiative to advance cooperation of business and technology between the United Arab Emirates and Israel, post the Abraham Accords.

Fusion LA is the first accelerator for Israeli startups in Los Angeles, United States. It screens and selects a portfolio of companies seeking to work with American partners and clients for its mentorship driven program. The accelerator facilitates communication and networking between venture capitalists in the Silicon Valley and the Israeli founders.

Program 
Between six and nine startups are selected for the nine-week program, each receiving a $110,000 cash investment, free office space in Santa Monica, and access to a network of investors and executives in Silicon Valley and Los Angeles. In 2020, due to the COVID-19 crisis and transition to remote work, Fusion LA announced a 3-week screening process from first meeting to an investment decision. The accelerator produced virtual and in-person sessions for the founders with industry professionals, mentors, advisors and investors. 

It invested in early-stage startups belonging to various industries such as video games, enterprise software, digital health, environmental technology, augmented reality, virtual reality, artificial intelligence, smart cities, and fintech.

As of 2020, Fusion LA has accelerated 49 startups that have raised more than $100 million in funding. Hoopo, GiantLeap, UniperCare, DigitalOwl, Spetz, Plantt, Magical and Agora are some of its notable alumni.

References 

Startup accelerators
Business incubators of the United States
2017 establishments in California
Organizations established in 2017